The 40th Writers Guild of America Awards honored the best television, and film writers of 1987. Winners were announced in 1988.

Winners & Nominees

Film 
Winners are listed first highlighted in boldface.

Television

Documentary

Special Awards

References

External links 

 WGA.org

1987
W
1987 in American cinema
1987 in American television